Nils-Bertil Dahlander, nicknamed Bert Dahlander but also known as Bert Dale, was a Swedish Jazz percussionist. Self-taught in violin and piano, he attended Juilliard and began his career playing on Thore Ehrling's radio band. He started visiting the US in 1954, first playing at The Beehive house band in Chicago, and working with Terry Gibbs for a year. He then played with Lars Gullin, before returning to the US in 1957 to rejoin Gibbs.

He performed as a member of Teddy Wilson's group, along with Gene Ramey and Al Lucas; they recorded several Columbia LPs, and was originally nicknamed Bert by Wilson. He also worked with Ben Webster in Sweden.

He was Cannonball Adderley's drummer for a time and toured across Europe with Chet Baker during 1955–56 (recording with Baker as well). He recorded the album Skål (Bert Dahlander and His Swedish Jazz) on Verve Records.

After his touring retirement in 1964, he played for many years in the house band at the Tippler at the base of Aspen Mountain.

References

Further reading
Carlo Bohländer, Karl Heinz Holler: Reclams Jazzführer (= Reclams Universalbibliothek. Nr. 10185). 2., revidierte und erweiterte Auflage. Reclam, Stuttgart 1977, .

External links

1928 births
2011 deaths
Jazz drummers
Swedish jazz musicians
Juilliard School alumni
Swedish expatriates in the United States